Tum Se Hi Talluq Hai is a Pakistani Urdu-language romantic drama series, produced by Asad Qureshi and Abdullah Kadwani under their banner 7th Sky Entertainment. The drama airs weekly episode on Geo Entertainment every Monday replacing drama serial Khaani. It stars Syed Jibran, Tooba Siddiqui and Faryal Mehmood in lead roles.

Synopsis
Our story revolves around the lives of Sadan, Alina and Rama. Sadan is married to his maternal side cousin Alina and has two daughters but he never liked her. Despite all her efforts and attention Sadan could never accept Alina as a life partner. Kulsoom, Sadan's mother is aware of her son's behavior with Alina and also knows about his intention of leaving Alina. To bind her son in marriage Kulsoom transfers all her property in Alina's name and makes it part of her will, after few months Kulsoom departs from this world. Meanwhile, Rama, a colleague from Sadan's office is struggling with her stepfather's illness and career. Sadan likes her and soon Rama will take advantage of Sadan's money and his position however Sadan has done everything for her because he is in love with Rama. Sadan is aware that his mother will never approve of Rama because Alina is from her side of the family. Once his mother dies and he learns about Kulsoom's will he throws Alina out of the house, keeps his daughters and brings Rama in his home.

Cast

 Syed Jibran as Saadan
 Tooba Siddiqui as Alina 
 Faryal Mehmood as Rahma
 Shamim Hilaly as Saadan's mother
 Anum Fayyaz as Naina (dead)
 Ali Abbas as Nakheel
 Shabbir Jan as Tahma's step-father
 Nida Mumtaz as Rahma's mother
 Khushi Maheen as younger Sidra
 Arez Ahmed as Ashir

Soundtrack 
The original soundtrack of Tum Se Hi Talluq Hai is composed and sang by Sahir Ali Bagga. The song is available on Patari.

References

Geo TV original programming
Pakistani television shows
2018 Pakistani television series debuts